Povien Bluff is the ice-covered bluff rising to 1455 m between the upper courses of Marla and Diplock Glaciers, in the northeast foothills of Detroit Plateau on southern Trinity Peninsula in Graham Land, Antarctica.  Bezenšek Spur is projecting east-southeastwards from the peak.

The feature is named after the settlement of Povien in Southern Bulgaria.

Location

Maps
 Antarctic Digital Database (ADD). Scale 1:250000 topographic map of Antarctica. Scientific Committee on Antarctic Research (SCAR). Since 1993, regularly upgraded and updated.

Notes

References
 Povien Peak. SCAR Composite Antarctic Gazetteer
 Bulgarian Antarctic Gazetteer. Antarctic Place-names Commission. (details in Bulgarian, basic data in English)

External links
 Povien Bluff. Copernix satellite image

Mountains of Trinity Peninsula
Bulgaria and the Antarctic